Barcelona Sporting Club's 2010 season was the club's 85th year of existence, and the 53rd in the top level of professional football in Ecuador. The club participated in their 52nd Campeonato Ecuatoriano de Fútbol, and their third Copa Sudamericana.

Serie A 

2010 will be Barcelona's 52nd season in the Serie A.

First stage

Second stage

Third stage

Copa Sudamericana

External links 
  

Barcelona S.C. seasons
Barcelona